Camera, hand lens, and microscope probe (CHAMP) is a microscope capable of color imaging with a spatial resolution ranging from infinity imaging down to 3 µm per pixel. The instrument was originally developed through the Mars Instrument Development Program (MIDP) in support of robotic field investigations, and was an instrument proposed for use on the 2011 Mars Science Laboratory rover mission to Mars. The instrument would allow examination of Martian surface features and materials (terrain, rocks, soils, samples) on spatial scales ranging from kilometers to micrometers, thus enabling both microscopy and context imaging with high operational flexibility. The instrument would allow for a better understanding of the evolution of the Martian surface over time. More specifically CHAMP would help gather data for a potential habitat for life on Mars.

References

Mars Science Laboratory
Space science experiments
Meteorological instrumentation and equipment